John Jermyn may refer to:

John Hervey, 7th Marquess of Bristol, aka John Jermyn
John Wesley Jermyn, homeless street performer in Los Angeles
John Jermyn (field hockey), Irish field hockey player